Global Intimacy is the thirteenth studio album by Australian jazz pianist and composer Barney McAll. It was released worldwide on 7 December 2018. Global Intimacy was released under the pseudonym TQX, also known as TourniquetX.

The album is inspired by the dystopian prophecies of TV drama Black Mirror, the Hollywood movie Her, and the very real spread of fake news via online networks. TQX wants to draw attention to this nightmarish situation, and wants to make everyone question the reliance on screens. The album cover is an image made by Banksy. However, TQX does not have the permission to use it.

Track listing

Critical reception 
NME described "The Day That You Moved On" as "mind bending" and "epic".

The Sydney Morning Herald Kish Lal gave the album three stars out of five and stated that the production of Global Intimacy is slick and reminiscent of PC Music's 2014 brand of anti-pop, yet elevated for this year. 4ZZZ's Chris Cobcroft noted that Global Intimacy is more-or-less a top-forty pop / hip hop record, that can be as sugary as any of Sia’s more recent confections. He also noted that lyrics are, the densest diatribe against the evils of the corporate music industry, technology, fascism, capitalism and more. The Australian Eric Meyers said about the album that the key to this work is the preponderance of lovely pop songs which comprise more than half the album. He also noted that they feature beautiful melody lines, highly intelligent lyrics, and the rich vocal harmonies characteristic of the best pop music, put together with considerable mastery.

References 

2018 albums